James La Fayette Evans (March 27, 1825 – May 28, 1903) was an American businessman and politician who served two terms as a U.S. Representative from Indiana from 1875 to 1879.

Biography 
Born in Clayville, Kentucky, Evans moved to Indiana, with his parents, who settled in Hancock County in 1837. He moved to Marion, Indiana, in 1845 and engaged in mercantile pursuits.

He settled in Noblesville in 1850 and continued mercantile pursuits. He also engaged in the grain-elevator business and in the pork-packing business.

Congress 
Evans was elected as a Republican to the Forty-fourth and Forty-fifth Congresses (March 4, 1875 - March 3, 1879). He was not a candidate for renomination in 1878. He resumed the grain-elevator business.

Death
He died in Noblesville, Indiana on May 28, 1903, aged 78, and was interred in Crownland Cemetery.

References

1825 births
1903 deaths
People from Harrison County, Kentucky
American people of Welsh descent
People from Noblesville, Indiana
People from Hancock County, Indiana
American merchants
People from Marion, Indiana
19th-century American politicians
19th-century American businesspeople
Republican Party members of the United States House of Representatives from Indiana